Fernseea is a genus of plants in the family Bromeliaceae, subfamily Bromelioideae, with two known species, both endemic to Brazil. The genus was named in honor of Moravian-Austrian botanist and physician at Vienna, Dr. Heinrich Ritter Wawra von Fernsee (1831-1887) by John Gilbert Baker.

Species
 Fernseea bocainensis E. Pereira & Moutinho  - Rio de Janeiro and São Paulo
 Fernseea itatiaiae (Wawra) Baker - Agulhas Negras

References

External links
 BSI Genera Gallery photos
 http://fcbs.org/pictures/Fernseea.htm

 
Bromeliaceae genera
Taxa named by John Gilbert Baker